"Five Gold Rings" is the second episode of the Rock & Chips trilogy and the series' first and only Christmas Special. It was first aired on December 29, 2010.

Plot
A few weeks following the birth of Rodney, Del Boy and the rest of his gang (Boycie, Trigger, Jumbo, Albie and Denzil) have left school. Del and Jumbo now work as market traders selling American records, while Boycie works as a cleaner for a Spanish second hand car dealer, Alberto Balsam. Del's mother, Joan, had been fired from the cinema following her pregnancy, but is now applying to get it back, and she has hired Grandad's wife, Violet, to babysit Rodney while she and Del are out, much to Grandad's chagrin. Joan, however, still misses her old lover, Freddie "The Frog" Robdal, the local gentleman villain and Rodney's real father, unknown to Reg and the rest of the family.

Robdal, meanwhile, has been detained along with his friend, Gerald "Jelly" Kelly, on the suspicion for robbing the jewellery store in Margate during the Jolly Boys' Outing with Del and the others, by the crooked DI Thomas and DC Stanton. Robdal and Kelly stand their ground, staunchly refusing to admit their guilt. Their lawyer arranges bail, and Thomas attempts to have it overturned, but is refused when the judge is revealed to be an old war friend of Robdal and Kelly. Robdal pays a visit to The Nag's Head and speaks with the bartender, whom he suspects of grassing him and Kelly to the police.

While in a bar with the others, Del tells them of his new plan to "break his cherry": following advice from Alberto, Del has acquired five rings made by the father of his friend, Abdul Khan, although they are merely made of gold-plated metal and glass, not gold and diamonds, and he will use them to get "engaged" to any girl he fancies. Whilst out selling records with the others, Del gets engaged to a former crush, Amita, who also appears to take a shine to Del. Not long after, Del and Jumbo are arrested by their old enemy, Roy Slater, who has now left school and become a police cadet. Although they show the receipts to Sergeant Foster, he sees through their farce by noticing Memphis misspelled on the receipt, meaning that they fabricated the receipts with their own printing material. Despite this, Foster lets them go, on the condition that he keep the records for himself, unaware that Del has loads more stored in his garage. Around the same time, Del also gets engaged to another girl, Gwen, and she invites him to dinner.

Robdal finds Joan in a coffee shop and offers her financial help, but she declines, afraid of what Reg will do if he finds out about their affair, and asks Robdal to stay away from her. One night, after Joan dyes her hair brown to resemble Elizabeth Taylor, Reg tells Joan of a job he was offered by a certain contact who was looking for a charlady for thirty pounds a week. The contact happens to be Robdal, who did this as a way of getting closer to Joan. During an argument, Joan accuses Robdal of playing the same mind games as Reg, hurting Robdal greatly, and he goes on to point out the major differences between himself and Reg, including his feelings for Joan. As Freddie prepares to head out, Joan runs up and kisses him, and they resume their affair.

Del, while at Gwen's house, makes a fool of himself by telling Gwen's family a rude (but misunderstood) French phrase which Joan learned from Robdal, and the engagement is off. At the same time, Amita comes to Del's flat, looking for him, and Del arrives shortly after, with Joan secretly chastising Del for his promiscuity. Comically, Reg and Violet fail to pronounce Amita's name properly and keep calling her "Anita".

However, Del's engagement to Amita is also ended when Amita takes a trip to Pakistan with her father and learns that Del bought five glass rings from Abdul's father. Heartbroken, Amita admits that she liked Del, and returns the ring to him. Del confides to Trigger of his plans to give up on the rings and find love the normal way, but reverts to the rings upon seeing another beautiful girl put off by Trigger's naïveté.

At the flat, with Del, Reg, and Grandad out at a New Year's party at the Nag's Head, Robdal pays Joan a visit and sees his son for the first time, holding baby Rodney in his arms.

Connections to Only Fools and Horses
 Del leaves school and becomes a market trader, setting up his image in Only Fools and Horses.
 Del's first use of two of his trademark quotes, "Cushty" and "You know it makes sense".
 Del's methods with his glass rings explain how he was able to get engaged to so many girls before the events of Only Fools and Horses, although he did not find true love until meeting Raquel Turner through a computer dating agency in "Dates". It is also revealed that this was the idea of Alberto Balsam, the predecessor to Boycie.
 Boycie is shown to be working as a car cleaner in a second hand car dealer's shop, setting up his image as a second hand car dealer himself in Only Fools and Horses.
 Roy Slater joins the police force, which leads to him becoming a major antagonist in "May The Force Be With You" and "To Hull and Back".
 Gwen asks Del if he has ever been to Holland. Del, Rodney and Uncle Albert later go to Holland to see a diamond merchant, Hendrick Van Kleefe, in "To Hull and Back".
 Del uses his first French phrase, which is obviously incorrect but which leads to him believing he is fluent in French. The episode reveals that Freddie the Frog was the source of this.
 Del bought his glass rings from the father of a fellow schoolboy named Abdul, who would also be mentioned in "Diamonds Are for Heather" and "Video Nasty", as well as appear in "To Hull and Back".
 Boycie claims that he will not fall in love and end up in an uneasy marriage so easily. This is almost exactly what he does between the events of Rock & Chips and Only Fools and Horses when he meets and marries Marlene Lane.
 Joan expresses belief that one day, Del will be a millionaire. One of Del's catchphrases in Only Fools and Horses is "This time next year, we'll be millionaires!", although it does not happen until "Time On Our Hands", and Del goes on to lose his fortune in the American Stock Market crash in "If They Could See Us Now".
 Paula Wilcox, who plays Violet Trotter, previously portrayed Pertunia, Boycie's sister-in-law, in the Only Fools and Horses spin-off The Green Green Grass.

Cast
Nicholas Lyndhurst as Frederick "The Frog" Robdal
James Buckley as Derek "Del Boy" Trotter
Kellie Bright as Joan Trotter
Shaun Dingwall as Reg Trotter
Phil Daniels as Grandad/Edward "Ted" Trotter
Paula Wilcox as Violet Trotter
Paul Putner as Gerald "Jelly" Kelly
Mel Smith as DI Thomas
Tom Brooke as DC Martin Stanton
Dave Lamb as Sergeant Foster
Daniel Cerqueira as Alberto Balsam
Stephen Lloyd as Boycie
Lewis Osborne as Trigger
Ashley Jerlach as Denzil
Lee Long as Jumbo Mills
Jonathan Readwin as Albie Littlewood
Calum McNab as Roy Slater
Robert Daws as Ernie Raynor
Joan Hodges as Gwen
Chandeep Uppal as Amita

External links

"Five Gold Rings" at the British Comedy Guide

2010 British television episodes
Television episodes about adultery
British Christmas television episodes
Only Fools and Horses
Peckham
Pregnancy-themed television episodes